The 2010–11 season is the 108th season in Bradford City A.F.C.'s history, their 96th in the Football League and 98th in the league system of English football. Their 14th-place finish in 2009–10 means this season will be their fourth successive season in League Two.

This article covers a period from 1 July 2010 to 30 June 2011.

They began their season with a defeat away at Shrewsbury Town. They then provided a shock during the League cup beating Championship side Nottingham Forest. They marked their first home league game of the season with a win over Stevenage F.C. The season then continued to be disappointing, eventually resulting in manager Peter Taylor leaving the club, with Peter Jackson taking charge as interim manager. The situation did not improve however, as the club slipped to its lowest league finish for many years. They ended the season with a 5 – 1 home defeat to Crewe. Interim manager Peter Jackson subsequently decided on a retained list, with 9 players released.

Matchday Squads

League Two 

1 1st Substitution, 2 2nd Substitution, 3 3rd Substitution.

F.A. Cup

1 1st Substitution, 2 2nd Substitution, 3 3rd Substitution.

League Cup 

1 1st Substitution, 2 2nd Substitution, 3 3rd Substitution.

Football League Trophy 

1 1st Substitution, 2 2nd Substitution, 3 3rd Substitution.

Results

League Two

League Cup

FA Cup

Football League Trophy

League data

League table

Results summary

Results by round

Appearances and goals
As of 6 May 2011.
(Substitute appearances in brackets)

Top scorers

Transfers

See also
 2010–11 in English football
 2010–11 Football League

References

Bradford City A.F.C. seasons
Bradford City